Luo Binwang (ca. 619–684?), courtesy name Guanguang (觀光/观光), was a Chinese poet of the Tang dynasty.  His family was from Wuzhou, modern Yiwu, Zhejiang, but he was raised in Shandong.  Luo is grouped with Lu Zhaolin, Wang Bo, and Yang Jiong as the Four Paragons of the Early Tang, the most outstanding poets of their time.

Early career 
It was said that Luo Binwang could recite poetry when he was six years old.  In adulthood, after a period serving on the staff of Li Yuanqing (李元慶) Prince of Dao, an uncle of then-ruling Emperor Gaozong, Luo worked in the central government in Chang'an from 665.  In 670, he was exiled to Xinjiang, after which he travelled to Yunnan with the army.  He later served on staff of the prominent general Pei Xingjian (裴行儉) while Pei was serving as the commandant at Tao Prefecture (洮州, roughly modern Haidong Prefecture, Qinghai), and was in charge of the military correspondences, but he did not have a good relationship with Pei, who also disapproved of the other three greater writers grouped with Luo — Wang, Yang, and Lu, instead favoring the talents of Wang Bo's brother Wang Ju (王勮) and Su Weidao.  Eventually, Luo became a secretary at the county government of Chang'an County — one of the two counties making up the capital Chang'an — a low position that was however considered fairly prestigious due to its location at the capital.

Participation in Li Jingye's rebellion 
In 678, Luo Binwang was dismissed and imprisoned for criticising Wu Zetian, but was released the following year.  After Emperor Gaozong's death and the subsequent takeover of Emperor Gaozong's wife Empress Dowager Wu (later known as Wu Zetian) as regent over initially their son Emperor Zhongzong, whom she quickly deposed, and then Emperor Ruizong, Luo made a number of suggestions to her, which she did not accept, and he was in turn demoted to the post of secretary general of Linhai County in 684.  He and a number of similarly demoted officials met at Yang Prefecture (揚州, roughly modern Yangzhou, Jiangsu), and they, supporting Li Jingye the Duke of Ying as their leader, rose against Empress Dowager Wu at Yang Prefecture, claiming as their goal Emperor Zhongzong's restoration.  Luo was in charge of the resistance forces' correspondences, and he wrote a particularly sharp-worded declaration against Empress Dowager Wu:

It was said that when Empress Dowager Wu read the declaration, she smiled and laughed at what he wrote.  However, when she reached the portion that read, "The soil on the new imperial tomb is not yet dry, and to whom can the two-meter-tall orphan be entrusted?" she turned solemn, and she commented, "It is the fault of the chancellors that we lost this man's service."  After Li Jingye's defeat later that year, Luo was also killed, and Empress Dowager Wu, impressed with his writing, sent people to gather them and publish them.

Style 

In prose, he was a master of the ornate pianwen 駢文 "parallel prose" style. His poetry (mostly gushi) is often similarly complex. Among his works is a long, autobiographical verse narrative, but he is best known for his poem "Ode to the Goose", said to have been written when he was seven years old. His "Ode to the Cicada" is also of great renown and influence.

References

 Ma, Maoyuan, "Luo Binwang". Encyclopedia of China (Chinese Literature Edition), 1st ed.
 Old Book of Tang,  vol. 190, part 2.
 New Book of Tang,  vol. 201.
 Zizhi Tongjian, vol. 203.

External links

Books of the Quan Tangshi that include collected poems of Luo Binwang at the Chinese Text Project:
Book 77
Book 78
Book 79
Ode to the Goose in Chinese and English
A Political Prisoner Listening to a Cicada, in Chinese with Witter Bynner's translation.
 

Three Hundred Tang Poems poets
Tang dynasty politicians from Zhejiang
619 births
684 deaths
Writers from Jinhua
Politicians from Jinhua
7th-century Chinese poets
Poets from Zhejiang
Deified Chinese people
People from Yiwu